American band Ivy has released six studio albums, one extended play (EP), fifteen singles, one promotional single, and eight music videos. After signing to Seed Records, Ivy released their debut EP, Lately, in May 1994. Their debut studio album Realistic was released in February 1995 and produced the singles "Get Enough" and "Don't Believe a Word", along with "Beautiful", which was issued as a promotional single. In 1995, a music video for "I Hate December", a song from Lately, was filmed and released. The song was then distributed as a single in January 1996. Ivy eventually left Seed and signed to Atlantic Records to record their second album Apartment Life, released in October 1997. To promote the album, "The Best Thing", "I've Got a Feeling", "This Is the Day", and "You Don't Know Anything" were made available as singles. Their third album Long Distance was released in Japan in 2000, and the next year in the United States. Three singles were promoted, including "Edge of the Ocean" which peaked at number 160 on the UK Singles Chart, marking their only appearance on that chart.

In September 2002, Ivy released Guestroom, their fourth studio album, which consisted of ten cover songs. It contained lead single "Digging Your Scene", which was previously included on Long Distance in 2000. They recorded covers of "Sing" and "Christmas Time Is Here" for the 2002 charity record For the Kids and 2004 compilation album Maybe This Christmas Tree, respectively. In the Clear was released as their fifth studio album in March 2005 and spawned the single "Thinking About You". They also lent the song "I'll Be Near You" to the soundtrack for the 2005 American film Bee Season. Ivy's sixth album, All Hours, was distributed in September 2011 by Nettwerk. It featured the singles "Distant Lights", "Fascinated" and "Lost in the Sun", all released during 2011 and 2012. All Hours peaked at number 12 on the Dance/Electronic Albums chart and number 25 on the Heatseekers Albums chart in the United States.

Studio albums

Extended plays

Singles

As lead artist

Promotional singles

Guest appearances

Music videos

References

External links 
 
 
 

Pop music discographies